James Stitt (1804—November 23, 1891) was High Constable of Toronto. He was born in Ireland in 1804 and emigrated to Canada around 1830. In 1836, he was appointed High Constable of Toronto and served for one year. He subsequently entered the cartage business.

He was appointed a customs officer in Toronto in 1850 and held that position until 1874.

References

Toronto police chiefs
Irish emigrants to pre-Confederation Ontario
Irish Protestants
1804 births
1891 deaths
Immigrants to Upper Canada